Modern is the sixth studio album recorded by Amber Smith. The album was released on 6 April 2015 by the German Kalinkaland Records. This was the first record with guitarist Tamás Faragó and bassist Oleg Zubkov. This was the first record without former Amber Smith bass guitarist Oszkár Ács.

Track listing
"The Day After"
"Barking Dog"
"Hold On to Your Love"
"Let Go"
"Flame to the Fire"
"Memories of TV"
"Same Old Tune"
"Batman vs Joker"
"The Return"
"Into the Blue"

Personnel
The following people contributed to Modern:

Amber Smith
 Bence Bátor - drums
 Tamás Faragó - additional guitars
 Imre Poniklo - vocals and guitars
 Oleg Zubkov - bass

Additional musicians and production
 Bence Brucker - recording
 Eszter Polyák - recording
 Zoltán Szabó - mixing
 György Ligeti - mixing (2) (6) & (9)
 Gábor Deutsch - mastering
 José Simon - artwork

References

External links
 Amber Smith at Kalinkaland's webpage
 Amber Smith at Amber Smith's webpage

2015 albums
Amber Smith (band) albums